The University of Nebraska College of Law is one of the professional graduate schools of University of Nebraska system. It was founded in 1888 and became part of University of Nebraska in 1891. According to Nebraska's official 2017 ABA-required disclosures, 70.3% of the Class of 2016 obtained full-time, long-term, JD-required employment nine months after graduation.

History
Nebraska Law is a charter member of the Association of American Law Schools and is accredited by the American Bar Association.

Employment and rankings 
According to Nebraska's official 2018 ABA-required disclosures, 87.5% of the Class of 2017 obtained full-time, long-term, JD-required or JD-advantage employment ten months after graduation. Nebraska's Law School Transparency under-employment score is 16.9%, indicating the percentage of the Class of 2013 unemployed, pursuing an additional degree, or working in a non-professional, short-term, or part-time job nine months after graduation.

In 2016, Business Insider ranked U.S. law schools placing a higher weight on jobs and no weight on selectivity or reputation, ranked UNL College of Law as the 44th best law school in America. The U.S. News & World Report law school rankings placed Nebraska 50th of the 215 law schools in the U.S. in 2014. For the 2021 U.S. News & World Report law school rankings placed Nebraska Law as the 19th best public law school and 76th best law school overall.

Costs
Cost per credit hour for the 2018–2019 academic year is $384.75 for residents and $1,016.75 for non-residents. Annual fees for the 2018–2019 academic year total $3,386 per student.

Notable alumni

C. Arlen Beam, 1965, Federal Judge
Curt Bromm, 1970, Speaker of the Nebraska Legislature
Jon Bruning, 1994, attorney general of Nebraska
Elmer Burkett, 1893, U.S. Senator from Nebraska
William G. Cambridge, 1955, Federal Judge
Laurie Smith Camp, 1977, Judge on United States District Court for the District of Nebraska
Hal Daub, 1966, U.S. Representative for Nebraska and mayor of Omaha
James Donnewald, 1949, Illinois State Treasurer
Jeffrey J. Funke, 1994, Justice, Nebraska Supreme Court
L. Steven Grasz, 1989, Federal Judge, United States Court of Appeals for the Eighth Circuit
Deborah R. Gilg, 1977, United States Attorney for the District of Nebraska
Stanley Knapp Hathaway, 1950, Governor of Wyoming
Michael Heavican, 1975, Chief Justice, Nebraska Supreme Court
Richard G. Kopf, 1972, Federal Judge
George Heinke, 1908, U.S. Representative for Nebraska
Frank Brenner Morrison, 1931, Governor of Nebraska
Fred Gustus Johnson, 1903, U.S. Representative for Nebraska
John Freudenberg, 1995, Justice, Nebraska Supreme Court
Harvey M. Johnsen, 1919, Chief Judge of the United States Court of Appeals for the Eighth Circuit
Richard G. Kopf, 1972, Federal Judge
Thomas F. Konop, 1904, U.S. Representative from Wisconsin
John A. Maguire, 1899, U.S. Representative for Nebraska
John R. McCarl, 1903, first Comptroller General of the United States
Howard Shultz Miller, 1900, U.S. Representative for Kansas
Thomas J. Monaghan, 1972, United States Attorney for the District of Nebraska
Ben Nelson, 1970, Governor of Nebraska, U.S. Senator from Nebraska
John J. Pershing, 1893, General of the Armies, Commander of American Expeditionary Forces in WWI
Harvey Perlman, 1966, Chancellor, University of Nebraska–Lincoln
John Coleman Pickett, 1922, Federal Judge
J. Lee Rankin, U.S. Solicitor General
William J. Riley, 1972, Chief Judge of the United States Court of Appeals for the Eighth Circuit
Donald Roe Ross, 1948, Federal Judge, United States Court of Appeals for the Eighth Circuit
Mark Quandahl, 1972, Federal Judge, U.S. Senator from Nebraska
Ted Sorensen, 1949, Special adviser and speechwriter to President John F. Kennedy
Kenneth C. Stephan, 1973, Justice, Nebraska Supreme Court
Stephanie Stacy, 1991, Justice, Nebraska Supreme Court
Joe Stecher, 1983, United States Attorney for the District of Nebraska
Charles Thone, 1950, U.S. Representative for Nebraska, Governor of Nebraska
Robert Van Pelt, 1922, Federal Judge
Arthur J. Weaver, 1896, Governor of Nebraska
John F. Wright, 1970, Justice, Nebraska Supreme Court
Lee Calvin White, 9th White Council and Special Counselor to the President of the United States
Clayton Yeutter, 1963, U.S. Secretary of Agriculture

Notable professors
Roger Kirst
Richard Dooling
William J. Riley, Federal Judge, adjunct Trial Advocacy professor
David Landis
Roscoe Pound
Harvey Perlman

References

External links
Official site

Law schools in Nebraska
Law, College of
Educational institutions established in 1888
1888 establishments in Nebraska